Ohl is an unincorporated community in Jefferson County, in the U.S. state of Pennsylvania.

History
A post office called Ohl was established in 1886, and remained in operation until 1933. The community was named for E. M. Ohl, a local merchant.

References

Unincorporated communities in Jefferson County, Pennsylvania
Unincorporated communities in Pennsylvania